Bert Salzman (September 2, 1931 – November 29, 2016) was an American writer and film director. He won the Academy Award for Best Live Action Short Film for directing Angel and Big Joe (1975).

Early life
Bert Salzman was born in 1931 in New York City and grew up in an orphanage. He never completed high school and became self-educated. As a young boy, he became interested with painting. At the age of 17, he enlisted in the United States Marine Corps and fought in the Korean War.

References

External links

1931 births
Directors of Live Action Short Film Academy Award winners
2016 deaths
Writers from New York City
Screenwriters from New York (state)
American male writers
Film directors from New York City